UTC+06:30 is an identifier for a time offset UTC+06:30.  MST is 6 hours 30 minutes earlier thanUTC+00:00. This time is used in:

UTC+06:30 is an identifier for a time offset from UTC of +06:30. This time is used in:

As standard time (year-round)

Southeast Asia
Principal cities: Yangon, Naypyidaw, Mandalay
 Myanmar – Myanmar Standard Time

Indian Ocean
 Cocos (Keeling) Islands

References

Time in Myanmar
UTC offsets
Time zones